Karen Hunter-Whishaw (born 26 August 1968) is a British former professional tennis player.

Hunter, ranked as high as 332 in the world, won her way through qualifying at the 1988 Wimbledon Championships, beating Veronika Martinek, Sam Smith and Karine Quentrec. She was beaten in the first round by Karen Schimper.

References

External links
 
 

1968 births
Living people
British female tennis players